Memorial Building may refer to:

Canada
 East and West Memorial Buildings, Ottawa

Malta
 Church of St Anne, Fort St Elmo, Valletta

United States
Places on the National Register of Historic Places
 Memorial Building (Dyersville, Iowa)
 Memorial Building (Topeka, Kansas)
 Memorial Building (Ironwood, Michigan)